Shinya Kadono (born 30 January 1997) is a Japanese footballer who plays as a midfielder for California United Strikers in the National Independent Soccer Association.

Career 
Kadono was selected by D.C. United in the 2019 MLS SuperDraft in the third round (72nd overall). Though D.C. United declined to offer him a contract in their preseason, he was signed by their USL Championship affiliate Loudoun United.

In May 2019, Kadono was called up to D.C. United for a friendly against La Liga side Real Betis Balompie.

On 27 July 2019, Kadono joined Tormenta FC on a loan for the remainder of the 2019 USL Championship season. He scored his first goal in his debut for Tormenta FC against Lansing Ignite FC that same day.

Kadono joined the California United Strikers on 26 February 2020.

References

External links
Profile at California Golden Bears website

1997 births
Living people
Association football forwards
California United Strikers FC players
California Golden Bears men's soccer players
D.C. United draft picks
Expatriate soccer players in the United States
Japanese expatriate footballers
Japanese footballers
Loudoun United FC players
Orange County SC U-23 players
San Francisco Glens players
Soccer players from California
Sportspeople from Irvine, California
Tormenta FC players
USL Championship players
USL League One players
USL League Two players
National Independent Soccer Association players